Linosta is a genus of moths of the family Crambidae and only genus in the Linostinae subfamily.

Species
Linosta annulifera Munroe, 1959
Linosta centralis Munroe, 1959
Linosta integrilinea Munroe, 1962
Linosta sinceralis Möschler, 1882

References

Crambidae
Crambidae genera